Wolfgang Dürheimer (born 20 June 1958)  is a German automotive business executive who, until January 2018, was the president of Bugatti Automobiles S.A.S. He was the former executive vice president of research and development at Porsche AG.

Life 

He was born in Martinzell in the Region of Oberallgäu on 20 June 1958.

He has a degree in Automotive Engineering and a Post Graduate degree in Engineering Business Management from the University of Applied Sciences, Munich.

Career 

He also has been the chairman and chief executive officer at Bentley Motors Limited and president of Bugatti Automobiles S.A.S. since June 1, 2014.

He has received a Fulbright scholarship. He also worked as the Chief executive officer and the Chairman of Bentley Motors.

References

External links
 

1958 births
Living people
Businesspeople from Bavaria
People from Oberallgäu
German businesspeople in transport